The Dandenong Ranges (commonly just The Dandenongs) are a set of low mountain ranges in Victoria, Australia, approximately  east of the state capital Melbourne. The namesaked Dandenong Creek and most of its left-bank tributaries (particularly the Eumemmerring Creek) originate from headwaters in these mountain ranges. Two of Melbourne's most important storage reservoirs, the Cardinia and Silvan Reservoir, are also located within the Dandenongs.

After European settlement in the Port Phillip Bay region, the range was used as a major local source of timber for Melbourne. The ranges were popular with day-trippers from the 1870s onwards. Much of the Dandenongs were protected by parklands as early as 1882 and by 1987 these parklands were amalgamated to form the Dandenong Ranges National Park, which was subsequently expanded in 1997. The range receives light to moderate snowfalls a few times in most years, frequently between late winter and late spring.

Today, The Dandenongs are home to over 100,000 residents and are popular amongst visitors, many of whom stay for the weekend at the various bed & breakfasts throughout the region. The popular Puffing Billy Railway, a heritage steam railway, runs through the hills villages of the eastern Dandenong Ranges.

Etymology

The etymology of the Dandenongs is a complicated one. Two names have been used to refer to the ranges; Corhanwarrabul and Dandenong, both derived from the Woiwurrung language of the Wurundjeri people.

It is thought that the name Dandenong was applied to the ranges due to being the origin of the Dandenong Creek; however, the original name for Dandenong Creek was Narra Narrawong. The origin of the name Dandenong is unknown, as is its meaning or correct spelling with other variations include; Tanjenong, Tangynon and Bangeong. In any case, both names relate to watercourses rather than mountains or ranges, as indicated by the ong ending. Given that the name Dandenong may not apply to anything in the immediate area, the relevance of the name Corhanwarrabul becomes apparent. Carhanwarrabul (pronounced either "corhan-warrabul" with a silent "h", or "cor-hana-warrabul") or Koran warrabin was the original name for one of the two main summits, perhaps both or perhaps the entire range. The name applied to the main summits and was in continued use up until around 1900, when the name Dandenong appeared. At any rate, Corhanwarrabul remains the most relevant name for the ranges to date.

Geology and ecology 

The range is the remains of an extinct volcano last active 373 million years ago. It consists predominantly of Devonian dacite and rhyodacite.

The topography consists of a series of ridges dissected by deeply cut streams. Sheltered gullies in the south of the range are home to temperate rain forest, fern gullies and Mountain Ash forest Eucalyptus regnans, whereas the drier ridges and exposed northern slopes are covered by dry sclerophyll forest of stringybarks and box. The entire range is highly prone to bushfires, the most recent of which have been the 1983 Ash Wednesday bushfires, the 1997 Dandenong Ranges bushfires and small fires during the Black Saturday bushfires in 2009.

A number of watercourses originate in the Dandenongs, these include:
Cardinia Creek
Clematis Creek
Dandenong Creek
Eumemmerring Creek
Emerald Creek
Ferny Creek
Mast Gully Creek
Menzies Creek
Monbulk Creek
Muddy Creek
Olinda Creek
Sassafras Creek
Sherbrooke Creek
Stringy Bark Creek
Wandin Yallock Creek
Woori Yallock Creek

Waterfalls
Olinda Falls
Sherbrooke Falls
Griffith Falls

Summits

Wildlife

The Dandenong Ranges are home to a variety of native Australian mammal, bird, reptile and invertebrate species. Well-represented bird species include the Sulfur-crested cockatoo, Superb lyrebird, Laughing kookaburra, and Crimson Rosella. Mammals include the Short-beaked echidna, Common wombat, Sugar glider, and Swamp wallaby. Invertebrates include two species of burrowing crayfish.

Climate

The Dandenong Ranges climate is generally mild and wet, with daily temperature variation generally low, often as low as 1 degree in the winter months. 
Rainfall is fairly uniform through the year, tending to peak between April and October with lower rainfall during January and February. The mean annual rainfall is between 1000 and 1500 mm, increasing with elevation and from west to east. The elevation means that temperatures are typically 2 to 5 °C cooler than the lower suburbs of Melbourne to the west , with temperatures typically lowering by 1 °C for every 150 m of elevation. Due to the elevation, fog is common in the winter months.

As a result of its elevation, snow typically falls one or two times a year at higher elevations, mostly between June and October. A rare summer snow occurred on Christmas Day 2006 . The local region has experienced substantial warming in recent decades  and heavy snowfalls which were once common have become rare. The last significant snowfall to affect the Dandenong Ranges was on August 10, 2008, when as much  fell at the highest elevations.

A Bureau of Meteorology weather station sits at an elevation of 513 m in the Ferny Creek Reserve in the southern part of the Dandenong Ranges. This weather station replaced one that was previously located on the summit of Dunns Hill.

Settlements in the Dandenong Ranges
Around 240,000 people live in and around the Dandenong Ranges, depending on the definition. The following settlements are located in the Dandenongs themselves (72,500~):

 Belgrave—3929
 Belgrave Heights—1,500
 Belgrave South—1,500
 Clematis—3,800
 Emerald—6,000
 Ferny Creek—1,500
 Ferntree Gully - 10,000
 Kallista—1,000
 Kalorama—1,100
 Kilsyth—10,000
 Menzies Creek—1,300
 Monbulk—2,700
 Montrose—6, 500
 Mount Dandenong—1,300
 Olinda—1,500
 Sassafras—1,000
 Selby—1,400
 Tecoma—2,200
 The Patch—800
 Upper Ferntree Gully—4,000
 Upwey—6,800

Some settlements located on and around the plateau to the east of the ranges are sometimes included (14,200~):
 Cockatoo—4,500
 Gembrook—1,600
 Macclesfield—1,600
 Seville—2,000
 Seville East—600
 Silvan—1,900
 Wandin East—500
 Wandin North—1,600

Settlements in the southern and western foothills are also sometimes included (180,500~):
 Western Foothills
 The Basin—4,100
 Boronia—20,500
 Mount Evelyn—9,100
 Southern Foothills
 Endeavour Hills—24,000
 Narre Warren—26,000
 Berwick—47,000
 Narre Warren North—7,700
 Harkaway—849
 Beaconsfield Upper—2,861

History

The ranges are located near the boundary between the Wurundjeri and Bunurong people's territories. The two nations were part of the Kulin alliance and were most often on friendly terms. The mountain range, however, was not often frequented by either nations people as mountainous areas were often considered one of many resting places for various spirits. 

In 1938, the aircraft Kyeema crashed on the western face of Mount Corhanwarrabul due to heavy fog and poor navigation. Eighteen people died.

Utilities

Transmission towers
There are several large television transmission towers on various summits that were initially constructed to broadcast TV to Central Victoria
Channel 10/Channel 0, 204m high—Mount Corhanwarrabul (628m), (highest frequency)
Channel 9, 131m high—Mount Corhanwarrabul (628m)
Channel 7, 131m high—Mount Corhanwarrabul (628m), this tower is from interesting design, as it is a partially guyed tower, consisting of a free-standing lattice tower as basement and a guyed mast as pinnacle.
Channel 2—Ferny Creek Summit (561m) (lowest frequency)
Channel 7, 9 and 10 all transmit from the 204M high ' Ornata Road ' TXA owned tower just to the South of Burke's Lookout. This tower also carries some of Melbourne, Victoria's commercial FM broadcast services. It also carries DAB+ digital radio services.
Channel 2 services ( ABC, JJJ, emergency services, Govt owned ) transmit from the 130M high Broadcast Australia ' Eyre Road ' tower. This is an interesting tower in that the base is of four legged, freestanding design, while the upper portion is guyed by two sets of three guy cables. This tower is just to the North of Burke's Lookout.
Adjacent to the Broadcast Australia tower, is the TXA ' Eyre Road ' standby tower, capable of transmitting 7, 9, and 10 signals in the event of an Ornata Road transmitter/antenna failure. This tower stands at 130M also and is a conventional four legged freestanding design. About 2 km to the North of this group of three towers, stands the original Channel 9 tower, built in 1956 to a height of 69M. This tower, on Observatory Road and adjacent to the Skyhigh lookout and restaurant now carries only some of Melbourne's commercial FM broadcast channels.

Tourism and attractions
Scenic drives—popular for many years on the abundance of winding roads throughout the ranges
Accommodation—1000 Reasons https://1000reasons.com.au
Picnics—dedicated picnic areas can be found in Fern Tree Gully Picnic Ground or at One Tree Hill or in Sherbrooke Forest. Emerald Lake Park has a variety of pretty picnic spots with electric barbecues, sheltered areas and water activities. This park with landscaped gardens adjoins the historic Nobelius Heritage Park 
The various coffee shops and restaurants, bed and breakfasts, craft shops, antique shops and gardens
Puffing Billy Railway—a narrow-gauge heritage steam railway, from Belgrave, through to Emerald, Cockatoo and ending at Gembrook
Lookouts & views—There are several locations throughout the ranges that offer excellent views on both sides of the range. On a clear day, features as far as Mount Macedon, the You Yangs and Port Phillip can be seen simultaneously
Walking & hiking—various tracks and trails are available at a variety of lengths and difficulties. For example; Four Brothers Rocks near Gembrook, Wright Forest near Cockatoo; The Eastern Dandenong Ranges Trail, which runs through Emerald, Cockatoo to Gembrook has a variety of open scenery and dappled woodland trails and at various stages follows the Puffing Billy railway line

Sherbrooke Falls, Sherbrooke
 Cycling—the Dandenong Ranges is one of Melbourne's most popular cycling areas. Popular road cycling climbs include the "1 in 20" on the Mountain Highway, "The Wall", a steeper route between Monbulk and Olinda, and the also-steep "Devil's Elbow", heading north from Upper Ferntree Gully along the Mount Dandenong Tourist Road to Ferny Creek . Also popular for picturesque and leisurely family bike rides is the Eastern Dandenong Ranges Trail, which runs through Emerald, Cockatoo to Gembrook

Regulations
Camping is not permitted within the National Park and fire restrictions may apply during the summer months. There are no rubbish bins in the national parks and visitors must leave with all items that they arrived with. Camping is permitted near Gembrook at Kurth Kiln Regional Park. Please stay informed and be prepared, so as to ensure you have a fun and safe experience. It is important to observe weather conditions and warnings during the bushfire season and follow official recommendations.

Bushfires
Due to the climate of the region, the type of vegetation and the topography, the Dandenong Ranges periodically experience bushfires. Some of the recent occurrences included:

1851—Black Thursday
1898
1905
1913
1926
1939
1962
1968
1983—Ash Wednesday, 27 deaths in the Dandenong ranges
1997—3 deaths in the ranges
2009—Black Saturday, no deaths in the ranges

Gallery

See also
Dandenong Ranges National Park
1938 Kyeema crash
 Horatio Jones house

References

External links

Accommodation - 1000 Reasons 
Eastern Dandenong Ranges
Blue Dandenongs
Parks Victoria
Info sourced from Knox Historical Society on place names in the area
 The dandenongs in colour

Great Dividing Range